Santa Ana Airport  is an airport serving Cartago, a city in the Valle del Cauca Department of Colombia.

Runway 19 has a  displaced threshold.

See also
Transport in Colombia
List of airports in Colombia

References

External links 
OpenStreetMap - Santa Ana
OurAirports - Santa Ana
SkyVector - Santa Ana
FallingRain - Santa Ana Airport

Airports in Colombia
Buildings and structures in Valle del Cauca Department